Oneclass is a Canadian note-sharing platform where students share class notes. The users uploads notes and receives credits, which can be used to exchange for other notes. Users who do not upload notes can access them by paying a subscription.

OneClass was founded by Jackey Li, Maggie Peng, Jack Tai and Kevin Wu, according to Forbes, the site covers over 10,000 courses with 11 million pages of content and around 5,000 video tutorials.

In 2020, OneClass agreed to pay $100,000 to the Canadian Radio-television and Telecommunications Commission (CRTC) for the violation of Canadian spam laws. OneClass failed to comply with various CASL requirements, including in how it promoted its platform and the installation of a program on students’ computers.

OneClass conducted a survey in December of 2020. In April 2020, OneClass found that 75% of university students were unhappy with the quality of online learning. The survey was conducted because 85% of college students reported the pandemic had a negative impact on their academic performance.

See also 
Knowledge management
List of academic databases and search engines

References

Ethically disputed educational practices
E-learning
Educational websites